The 1923 New Hampshire football team was an American football team that represented the University of New Hampshire as a member of the New England Conference during the 1923 college football season. In its eighth season under head coach William "Butch" Cowell, the team compiled a 4–4–1 record, and outscored opponents by a total of 106 to 75. The team played its home games in Durham, New Hampshire, at Memorial Field.

This was the first season that the team represented the University of New Hampshire, which had been incorporated on July 1, 1923. In prior seasons, the school had operated as New Hampshire College of Agriculture and the Mechanic Arts. This was also the first season of play for the New England Conference.

Schedule

The Vermont game was attended by Governor of New Hampshire Fred H. Brown.

During the November 3 game against Lowell Textile, New Hampshire tackle Leonard P. Stearnes experienced abdominal pain. Later admitted to a hospital in his hometown of Belmont, Massachusetts, he died on November 8. The 1925 edition of The Granite, New Hampshire's annual college yearbook, was dedicated to Stearnes.

Team captain Cy Wentworth set, and still holds, the New Hampshire record for most points scored in a single game, with 37 points against Lowell Textile, made via six touchdowns and one extra point kick.

Notes

References

New Hampshire
New Hampshire Wildcats football seasons
New Hampshire football